The Betäubungsmittelgesetz (BtMG; Narcotics Law) is the controlled substances law of Germany.  In common with the Misuse of Drugs Act of 1971 of the United Kingdom and Controlled Substances Acts of the US and Canada, it is a consolidation of prior regulation and an implementation of treaty obligations under the Single Convention on Narcotic Drugs, Convention on Psychotropic Substances and other treaties.

The BtMG updated the German Opium Law 1929 and mirrors the Swiss BtMG and Austrian Suchtmittelgesetz.

See also
 Drug policy of Germany
 Drugs controlled by the German Betäubungsmittelgesetz

Links
 Non-official translation (as of 2009)

References

German criminal law
Drug policy of Germany
Drug control law